Afif-Abad Garden, originally the Gulshan Garden, is a museum complex in Shiraz, Iran.

in the affluent Afif-Abad district of Shiraz, the complex was constructed in 1863. It contains a former royal mansion, a historical weapons museum, and a Persian garden, all open to the public.

History
The Gulshan Garden is one of the oldest gardens in Shiraz.

During the Safavid dynasty, it was used as a palace by the Safavid Kings.

The current main building was constructed by Mirza Ali Mohammad Khan Qavam II in 1863. He bought a nearby qanat to water his garden. After his death, the garden was eventually inherited by his niece, Afife; thus being called "Afif-Abad".

In 1962, it was restored by the army. It now functions as a weapons museum.

Gallery

See also
Persian garden
Persian architecture

References

Houses completed in 1863
Museums in Iran
Architecture in Iran
Houses in Iran
Persian gardens in Iran
Buildings and structures in Shiraz
Tourist attractions in Shiraz